In seven-dimensional Euclidean geometry, the 7-simplex honeycomb is a space-filling tessellation (or honeycomb). The tessellation fills space by 7-simplex, rectified 7-simplex, birectified 7-simplex, and trirectified 7-simplex facets. These facet types occur in proportions of 2:2:2:1 respectively in the whole honeycomb.

A7 lattice 
This vertex arrangement is called the A7 lattice or 7-simplex lattice. The 56 vertices of the expanded 7-simplex vertex figure represent the 56 roots of the  Coxeter group.  It is the 7-dimensional case of a simplectic honeycomb. Around each vertex figure are 254 facets: 8+8 7-simplex, 28+28 rectified 7-simplex, 56+56 birectified 7-simplex, 70 trirectified 7-simplex, with the count distribution from the 9th row of Pascal's triangle.

 contains  as a subgroup of index 144.

The A lattice can be constructed as the union of two A7 lattices, and is identical to the E7 lattice.

 ∪  = .

The A lattice is the union of four A7 lattices, which is identical to the E7* lattice (or E).

The A lattice (also called A) is the union of eight A7 lattices, and has the vertex arrangement to the dual honeycomb of the omnitruncated 7-simplex honeycomb, and therefore the Voronoi cell of this lattice is an omnitruncated 7-simplex.

 ∪
 ∪
 ∪
 ∪
 ∪
 ∪
 ∪

Related polytopes and honeycombs

Projection by folding 

The 7-simplex honeycomb can be projected into the 4-dimensional tesseractic honeycomb by a geometric folding operation that maps two pairs of mirrors into each other, sharing the same vertex arrangement:

See also 
Regular and uniform honeycombs in 7-space:
7-cubic honeycomb
7-demicubic honeycomb
Truncated 7-simplex honeycomb
Omnitruncated 7-simplex honeycomb
E7 honeycomb

Notes

References 
 Norman Johnson Uniform Polytopes, Manuscript (1991)
 Kaleidoscopes: Selected Writings of H. S. M. Coxeter, edited by F. Arthur Sherk, Peter McMullen, Anthony C. Thompson, Asia Ivic Weiss, Wiley–Interscience Publication, 1995,  
 (Paper 22) H.S.M. Coxeter, Regular and Semi Regular Polytopes I, [Math. Zeit. 46 (1940) 380–407, MR 2,10] (1.9 Uniform space-fillings)
 (Paper 24) H.S.M. Coxeter, Regular and Semi-Regular Polytopes III, [Math. Zeit. 200 (1988) 3–45]

Honeycombs (geometry)
8-polytopes